Oliver Anderson was the defending champion, but was no longer eligible to participate.

Zsombor Piros won the title after defeating Yshai Oliel 4–6, 6–4, 6–3 in the final.

Seeds

Draw

Finals

Top half

Section 1

Section 2

Bottom half

Section 3

Section 4

Qualifying

Seeds

Qualifiers

Lucky losers

Draw

First qualifier

Second qualifier

Third qualifier

Fourth qualifier

Fifth qualifier

Sixth qualifier

Seventh qualifier

Eighth qualifier

External links 
 Main draw  at ausopen.com
 Draw at itftennis.com

Boys' Singles
Australian Open, 2017 Boys' Doubles